Centrum Arena may refer to several sports venues:
Centrum Arena (Utah), the home of the Southern Utah University Thunderbirds
Centrum Arena (Prestwick), the home of the Ayr Scottish Eagles